Youngstown station may refer to:

 Youngstown station (Baltimore and Ohio Railroad) Extant, revived twice by Amtrak
 Youngstown station (Erie Railroad) Extant, closed in 1977 by Conrail; served by the Pittsburgh and Lake Erie Railroad
 Youngstown station (Pennsylvania Railroad) Extant, currently owned by Phantom Fireworks
 Youngstown station (New York Central Railroad) Demolished; also served by the Pittsburgh and Lake Erie Railroad